

Administrative and municipal divisions

References

Ulyanovsk Oblast
Ulyanovsk Oblast